Eulepidotis ornata is a moth of the family Erebidae first described by Constant Bar in 1876. It is found in the Neotropical realm, including French Guiana, Guyana, Peru and Ecuador.

References

Moths described in 1876
ornata